Betsiboka is a region of Madagascar. It borders Boeny Region in north, Sofia in northeast, Alaotra-Mangoro in east, Analamanga and Bongolava in south and Melaky in west. The capital of the region is Maevatanana. Until 2009 Betsiboka belonged to Mahajanga Province. Betsiboka is one of the least densely populated regions in Madagascar.

Administrative divisions
Betsiboka Region is divided into three districts, which are sub-divided into 36 communes.

 Kandreho District - 6 communes
 Maevatanana District - 16 communes
 Tsaratanana District - 10 communes

Transport

Airport
Tsaratanana Airport

Protected Area
 The Kasijy Reserve is located in this region.

See also
 Betsiboka Bridge
 Betsiboka River

References

 
Regions of Madagascar